Lorenzo Stovini (born 24 November 1976) is a former Italian footballer who played as a defender.

Career
He made his Serie A debut on 31 August 1997 playing for Vicenza against Sampdoria in Stadio Luigi Ferraris (3–1). In the past, he was also Lecce captain.

Calcio Catania
Since he joined Calcio Catania, he is currently competing in the Italian Serie A. Since joining the Sicilian side from US Lecce, Stovini has been a big part of the club's first team. He was an influential part of there Serie A survival in the center of defence, along with Christian Terlizzi, during the 2006–07 Serie A campaign as well as the 2007–08 Serie A season.

Empoli
On 4 November 2009, he signed with Serie B team Empoli.

External links

Italian footballers
A.S. Roma players
L.R. Vicenza players
Reggina 1914 players
U.S. Lecce players
Empoli F.C. players
Catania S.S.D. players
Brescia Calcio players
Serie A players
Serie B players
Association football defenders
Footballers from Florence
1976 births
Living people